The keel-billed motmot (Electron carinatum) is a species of bird in the motmot family Momotidae. It is very closely related to the broad-billed motmot, and the two may be the same species. The two are similar sizes and shapes, and have been reported to have similar calls, but they do have different plumage.

It is found in Belize, Costa Rica, Guatemala, Honduras, Nicaragua, and Mexico. Its natural habitats are tropical moist lowland forests and tropical moist montane forests.

The plumage is green overall, olive-cinnamon green below. The forehead is reddish, with a black mask on the face and a blue stripe above the eye. The chin is turquoise, and there is a black spot on the chest. The bill is long, broad and slightly serrated. The long tail ends in a pair of raquettes.

Very little is known about the behaviour of this species. They hawk for insects from a perch, in the manner typical of the family, hawking for insects from a perch. All that is known about their breeding behaviour is that males have been heard making territorial calls between January and March, and that nesting burrows have been found in the banks of streams and, in Belize, in the sides of unexcavated Mayan ruins.

It is threatened by rapid loss of its fragmented forest habitat. The species requires large tracts of undisturbed primary forest, which is being cleared for cultivation. The largest population is thought to be in Belize. The species is absent from many areas that appear to provide suitable habitat. The species was thought to be extinct in Mexico, but was rediscovered in 1995. The species is listed as Vulnerable by the IUCN.

References

External links
BirdLife species factsheet.

keel-billed motmot
Birds of Belize
Birds of Honduras
Birds of Nicaragua
Birds of Costa Rica
keel-billed motmot
keel-billed motmot
Taxonomy articles created by Polbot